Musical Pairing is a patented technique of pairing music with food and beverages using a mathematical formula. This phrase is the registered trademark of Musical Pairing Inc. The company was named as a Top 10 Pop-up Restaurant by Fodor's in 2015.

References

External links
 Musical Pairing Official site

Musical terminology